Upekha Ashantha Fernando (born December 17, 1979, in Colombo) is a former Sri Lankan first-class cricketer who played for the Sinhalese Sports Club from 1997–98 to 2002–03. He captained the Sri Lankan Under-19 team against India in 1998–99. An all-rounder, he bowled right-arm off-cutters and batted right-handed, often opening the batting.

Upekha Fernando lost his place in the team after an injury.  He is employed in the outsourcing business.

External links 
 Cricinfo profile

1979 births
Living people
Sri Lankan cricketers
Sinhalese Sports Club cricketers